Rawal  is a village in Kapurthala district of Punjab State, India. The village is administrated by a Sarpanch who is an elected representative of village as per the constitution of India and Panchayati raj (India).

Demography 
According to the report published by Census India in 2011, Rawal has 142 houses with a total population of 635 persons of which 337 are male and 298 female. The literacy rate of Rawal is 90.43%, higher than the state average of 75.84%.  The population of children in the age group 0–6 years is 81 which is 12.76% of the total population.  Child sex ratio is approximately 653, lower than the state average of 846.

Population data

References

External links
  Villages in Kapurthala
 Kapurthala Villages List

Villages in Kapurthala district